Eumunida chani is a species of chirostylid squat lobster first found in Taiwan. This species can be distinguished by its absence of a pad of densely distributed setae on its first pereopod, the anterior branchial margin which bears two spines, and the carpus of its first pereopod carrying only two spines.

References

Further reading
Baba, Keiji, et al. "Eumunida Smith, 1883."
Osawa, Masayuki, Chia-Wei Lin, and Tin-Yam Chan. "Additional records of Chirostylus and Munidopsis (Crustacea: Decapoda: Galatheoidea) from Taiwan." The Raffles Bulletin of Zoology, Supplement 19 (2008): 91-98.

External links

WORMS

Squat lobsters